2023 college football season may refer to:

American leagues
2023 NCAA Division I FBS football season
2023 NCAA Division I FCS football season
2023 NCAA Division II football season
2023 NCAA Division III football season
2023 NAIA football season

Non-American leagues
2023 U Sports football season